Centuries Before Love and War is an album by Stars of Track and Field. It was released on August 22, 2006 to the iTunes Store and was physically released January 16, 2007.  The album's release was delayed due to the band moving from SideCho to Wind-Up Records.

Track listing
 "Centuries" – 3:05
 "Movies of Antarctica" – 4:25
 "With You" – 3:56
 "Lullaby for a G.I. / Don't Close Your Eyes" – 4:27
 "Real Time" – 4:07
 "Arithmatik" – 3:46
 "U.S. Mile 5" – 3:01
 "Say Hello" – 3:46
 "Exit the Recital" – 3:50
 "Fantastic" – 4:04

References

2006 albums
Stars of Track and Field albums